The 2020 U Sports Women's Final 8 Basketball Tournament was held March 5–8, 2020, in Ottawa, Ontario. The Saskatchewan Huskies defeated the Brock Badgers to win the national championship, which was the second Bronze Baby trophy win in program history.

It was jointly hosted by Carleton University, the University of Ottawa, and the Ottawa Sports & Entertainment Group (OSEG) at TD Place Arena. It was also held in conjunction with the 2020 U Sports Men's Basketball Championship which occurs on the same weekend. This was the first time that the city of Ottawa hosted the women's championship game.

Participating teams

Championship Bracket

Consolation Bracket

Awards and honours

Top 100 
In celebration of the centennial anniversary of U SPORTS women’s basketball, a committee of U SPORTS women’s basketball coaches and partners revealed a list of the Top 100 women's basketball players. Commemorating the 100th anniversary of the first Canadian university women’s contest between the Queen’s Gaels and McGill Martlets on Feb. 6, 1920, the list of the Top 100 was gradually revealed over four weeks. Culminating with the All-Canadian Gala, which also recognized national award winners.

 Nan Copp Award (recognizing U Sports Player of the Year): Jenna Mae Ellsworth, UPEI Panthers

Championship All-Star Team 
Championship MVP : Sabine Dukate, Saskatchewan
Sabine Dukate, Saskatchewan
Summer Masikewich, Saskatchewan
Melissa Tatti, Brock
Samantha Keltos, Brock
Jenna Mae Ellsworth, UPEI

Player of the Game Awards 
 Nike Top Performers - March 7, 2020 - Semi-Final 1: Brock vs. UPEI - Brock: Samantha Keltos, UPEI: Jenna Mae Elsworth 
 Nike Top Performers - March 7, 2020 - Semi-Final 2: Saskatchewan vs. Laval - Saskatchewan: Megan Ahlstrom, Laval: Carrie-Ann Auger 
 Nike Top Performers - March 7, 2020 - Fifth place Game: Calgary vs. Carleton - Carleton: Jaclyn Ronson, Calgary: Liene Staldazine 
 Nike Top Performers - March 8, 2020 - Bronze Medal Game: UPEI vs. Laval - UPEI: Reese Baxendale, Laval: Kim Letang 
 Nike Top Performers - March 8, 2020 - Gold Medal Game: Saskatchewan vs. Brock - Saskatchewan: Sabine Dukate, Brock: Samantha Keltos

See also 
2020 U Sports Men's Basketball Championship

References

External links 
 Tournament Web Site

U Sports Women's Basketball Championship
U Sports women's basketball
2019–20 in Canadian basketball
2020 in women's basketball
Carleton University
University of Ottawa
Sports competitions in Ottawa